Attorney General Poe may refer to:

Edgar Allan Poe (Maryland attorney general) (1871–1961), Attorney General of Maryland
John P. Poe Sr. (1836–1909), Attorney General of Maryland